Sir Vivian Richards Stadium is a stadium in North Sound, Antigua, Antigua and Barbuda. It was built for use in the 2007 Cricket World Cup where it hosted Super 8 matches. The stadium usually caters for 10,000 people, but temporary seating doubled its capacity for the 2007 World Cup. The stadium is named after former West Indies cricket captain Viv Richards.

Location
The stadium is about 10–20 minutes' drive from the capital city, St. John's, and the country's international airport. The venue cost approximately US$60 million to build, with the majority of the funds coming from a Chinese Government grant.
The first Test match staged on the ground began on 30 May 2008 when the West Indies hosted Australia, with the match ending in a draw.

Facilities

The stadium constitutes two main stands: the Northern Stand and the five-story South Stand. In 2008, the roof of the South Stand was damaged by high winds.
Other facilities include a practice pitch for the various cricket teams, training infrastructure and a media centre. Sir Viv Richards Stadium is one of the few state-of-the-art venues that encompass underground passageways for the cricket teams to move about in.

Prior to the start of the first Test against England on 13 April 2015, the north and south ends were renamed for two former West Indies cricketers, Sir Curtly Ambrose and Sir Andy Roberts.

Outfield controversy 
The ground's second Test match against England on 13 February 2009 was abandoned after only ten balls due to the outfield's dangerous condition.

The groundstaff had applied extra layers of sand after recent heavy rain, and again after a brief shower the morning of the match; this resulted in West Indian bowlers Jerome Taylor and Fidel Edwards being unable to gain any traction when running in. 

The sandy nature of the outfield had earnt the ground the nickname of 'Antigua's 366th beach' in the buildup to the game. 

Following the abandonment, inquiries were held by the WICB and the ICC: these caused great embarrassment for West Indies cricket.

The ICC subsequently ordered that the ground be suspended from staging any international matches for twelve months, and an official warning was issued to the WICB.

List of five wicket hauls

Tests
Eight five wicket hauls in Test matches have been taken at the venue.

One Day Internationals
One five wicket haul in One-Day Internationals has been taken at the venue.

Twenty20 Internationals
One five wicket haul in Twenty20 Internationals has been taken at the venue.

See also 
 List of Test cricket grounds
 Stanford Cricket Ground

References

External links 
 Cricinfo

Sports venues in Antigua and Barbuda
Saint George Parish, Antigua and Barbuda
Cricket grounds in Antigua and Barbuda
Football venues in Antigua and Barbuda
Test cricket grounds in the West Indies
Sports venues completed in 2006
2006 establishments in Antigua and Barbuda
Chinese foreign aid
2007 Cricket World Cup stadiums